Nonggirrnga Marawili (born c. 1939) is an Australian Yolngu painter and printmaker. She is the daughter of the acclaimed artist and pre-contact warrior Mundukul. Marawili was born on the beach at Darrpirra, near Djarrakpi (Cape Shield), as a member of the Madarrpa clan. She grew up in both Yilpara and Yirrkala in Arnhem Land in the Northern Territory, but lived , meaning her family would move frequently, camping at Madarrpa clan-related sites between Blue Mud Bay and Groote Eylandt.  she lives and works in the community at Yirrkala.

Career 
Marawili learnt how to paint on bark in the 1980s while assisting her late husband, Djutadjuta Mununggurr, with his artwork depicting his designs from clan, Djapu. During this time, they both played an integral role revitalising Yolngu art practice, which had grown stale due to repetitiveness and the tourist market. In her practice she depicts the sacred forms from her Madarrpa heritage and the stories shared with her by her father, Mundukul, and late husband.

Marawili's printmaking career started after art-coordinator Andrew Blake opened the Yirrkala Print Space in 1995. These prints feature both aspects of daily life and aspects of various clans including Djapu, Madarrpa and Galpu. Between the years of 1998 and 2015 she has created 21 prints including screen prints, etchings, and woodblock prints. Some notable print works of hers are Garrangali (1998), Bäru (1999) and Guya (2001).

Blake also brought back the tradition of "big barks" at Yirrkala which renewed the community's interest in bark painting. This led Nonggirrnga to her first solo commission, Banumbirr, Morning Star, in 1994. She, then, was commissioned by John Kluge in 1996, creating Djapu, Galpu Ties which was a collaborative work with fellow artists Rerrkirrwanga and Marrnyula Mununggurr. As the name suggests, this work was about ties between her husband's clan, Djapu, and her mother's clan, Galpu.

While she began her career in the 1990s, Marawili only began painting regularly in 2005. After encouragement from the art-coordinator Will Stubbs, she created Wititj (2005) and Untitled (2005) which demonstrate her ability to not paint strictly traditional designs but rather subtly reference them. Works like these demonstrate Nonggirrnga's Yolngu ability to "acknowledge that change happens on the surface [and] embrace it imaginatively and productively. But...view the principles and laws laid down by the ancestral beings as an eternal template that underpins their stewardship of their country."

In 2011 she began to paint at the courtyard of Buku-Larrnggay Mulka Centre. Marawili reached acclaim soon after her 2013 exhibit And I am still here held at Alcaston Gallery in Melbourne which featured fifteen paintings and four larrakitj (memorial poles). These painted works featured in this exhibit combine elements of Djapu designs, such as cross-hatching and lattice (like that of traditionally woven twigs), and Madarrpa, such as diamonds. These works also share the theme of hunting, seen through the subject matter of teacups, teapots, and dilly-bags. Despite traditionally-based themes, Marwili still claimed that these are designs of her own, not traditional. In a 2013 interview she stated that the fire she painted is "just an ordinary fire, not a Madarrpa fire". In 2015 she had her Manhattan debut with her diptych Baratjala (2014) at the James Cohan Gallery in the exhibit All Watched Over.

Marawili is a two-time winner of the bark painting prize at the National Aboriginal and Torres Strait Islander Art Awards, winning the award in 2015 for her work Lightning in the Rock (which was subsequently acquired by the National Gallery of Victoria) and again in 2019 for the painting Lightning Strikes. Marawili is known for distilling "the designs of the Djapu and Madarrpa clans to their essential compositional elements", which is seen through the theme of lightning. This theme is associated with the Madarrpa's Lightning Snake, an ancestral snake who uses lightning and thunder to communicate with other ancestral snakes.

The barks featured in Marking the Infinite: Contemporary Women Artists from Aboriginal Australia depict lightning, water, fire, and rock, which are key to sacra, or Madarrpa sacred laws; however, she deviates from conventions of traditional painting. She once said "The painting that I do is not sacred. I can’t steal my father’s [sacred Madarrpa] paintings. I just do my own designs from the outside. Water. Rock. Rocks which stand strong, and the waves which run and crash upon the rock. The sea spray. This is the painting I do... But I know the sacred designs". However, since 2015 she has been granted the ability to paint some clan designs that connect the Madarrpa to the estate of Baratjula which was a seasonal camp for Marawili as a child and is associated with ancestral trade with Macassan merchants.

In 2019 an exhibition titled Nonggirrnga Marawili: From My Heart and Mind was held at the Art Gallery of New South Wales. In his review, Sydney Morning Herald art critic John McDonald considered her "one of the most dynamic Indigenous artists at work today". The exhibition was documented in a stand-alone book of the same name. In 2020 her work was featured at the Sydney Biennale at the Campbelltown Arts Center and the Museum of Contemporary Art Australia. 

Marawili's works are held in the collections of the National Gallery of Australia, the Auckland Art Gallery Toi o Tāmaki, the Museum of Contemporary Art, the Metropolitan Museum of Art, the Kluge-Ruhe Aboriginal Art Collection of the University of Virginia, the National Gallery of Victoria and the Art Gallery of New South Wales.

Significant exhibitions 

 2013: And I am still here. Alcaston Gallery, Melbourne, VIC
2015: All watched over. James Cohan Gallery, Manhattan, NY
2016-2019: Marking the Infinite: Contemporary Women Artists from Aboriginal Australia. Newcomb Art Museum, Tulane University, New Orleans, LA; Frost Art Museum, Florida International University, Miami, FL; Nevada Museum of Art, Reno, NV; The Phillips Collection, Washington, DC; and the Museum of Anthropology, University of British Columbia, Vancouver, BC, Canada.
 2017: Defying Empire: 3rd National Indigenous Art Triennial. National Gallery of Australia, Canberra, ACT.
 2018-2019: Nonggirrnga Marawili: From My Heart and Mind. Art Gallery of New South Wales, Sydney, NSW.
2020: By the Strength of Her Skin. Second Street Gallery, Charlottesville, VA.
2020: Nirin: The 22nd Biennale of Sydney. Museum of Contemporary Art, Sydney, NSW.

Collections 

Art Gallery of New South Wales
Metropolitan Museum of Art, New York
Museum and Art Gallery of the Northern Territory
National Gallery of Australia
National Gallery of Victoria
Kluge-Ruhe Aboriginal Art Collection of the University of Virginia

References

Living people
Year of birth missing (living people)
20th-century Australian artists
21st-century Australian artists
Indigenous Australian artists
Artists from the Northern Territory
20th-century Australian women artists
21st-century Australian women artists